Tomoi may refer to:

 The Malaysian name for the martial arts style also known as muay Thai
 Tomoi (manga), Japanese manga series by Wakuni Akisato
 Yūsuke Tomoi, Japanese actor
 Fumito Tomoi, Japanese television host